Santa Rita Arriba is a town in the Colón province of Panama. This locality has a particular tropical forest and mountainous ecosystem; with elevation of 200 m above sea level. It is near the Panama Canal lakes and the Trinidad River. The area holds an important diversity of insects, and as a result, recently has been described a new rare moth of the genus Pavolechia.

Sources 
World Gazetteer: Panama – World-Gazetteer.com
 Heppner, J.B. and Corro-Chang, P. 2017. Panama moth notes, The Neotropical Genus Pavolechia (Lepidoptera: Gelechiidae: Anacampsinae). Lepidoptera Novae, 10(1-2): 67–70.

Populated places in Colón Province